Big Stone Gap East is an unincorporated area and census-designated place (CDP) in Wise County, Virginia, United States. It was first listed as a CDP in the 2020 census with a population of 687.

The CDP is in the southwest part of the county, on the east edge of the town of Big Stone Gap, outside the town limits. U.S. Route 23 and 58, a four-lane expressway, curves to the south and east of the community, separating it from East Stone Gap to the south.

References 

Populated places in Wise County, Virginia
Census-designated places in Wise County, Virginia
Census-designated places in Virginia